Puchkayuq Punta (Quechua puchka spindle, -n a suffix, punta peak; ridge, "the peak (or ridge) with a spindle", also spelled Puchcayoc Punta) is a mountain in the Cordillera Blanca in the Andes of Peru which reaches a height of approximately . It is located in the Ancash Region, Yungay Province, Yungay District, northwest of Huascarán.

References 

Mountains of Peru
Mountains of Ancash Region